Filadelfio is a village and a community of the Volvi municipality in Greece. Before the 2011 local government reform it was part of the municipality of Arethousa, of which it was a municipal district. The 2011 census recorded 220 inhabitants in the village and 808 in the community. The community of Filadelfio covers an area of 48.573 km2.

Administrative division
The community of Filadelfio consists of three separate settlements (2011 populations): 
Anoixia (population 238)
Filadelfio (population 220)
Xiropotamos (population 350)

See also
 List of settlements in the Thessaloniki regional unit

References

Populated places in Thessaloniki (regional unit)